The 2015–16 Cornell Big Red men's basketball team represented Cornell University during the 2015–16 NCAA Division I men's basketball season. The Big Red, led by sixth year head coach Bill Courtney, played their home games at Newman Arena and were members of the Ivy League. They finished the season 10–18, 3–11 in Ivy League play to finish in a tie for seventh place.

On March 14, 2016, Cornell fired head coach Bill Courtney. He finished at Cornell with a six-year record of 60–113. On April 18, the school hired Brian Earl as head coach.

Previous season 
The Big Red finished the season 13–17, 5–9 in Ivy League play to finish in a tie for fifth place.

Departures

Recruiting

Recruiting class of 2016

Roster

Schedule

|-
!colspan=9 style="background:#B31B1B; color:#FFFFFF;"| Non-conference regular season

|-
!colspan=9 style="background:#B31B1B; color:#FFFFFF;"| Ivy League regular season

References

Cornell Big Red men's basketball seasons
Cornell
Cornell Big Red men's basketball
Cornell Big Red men's basketball